Dessau – Wittenberg is an electoral constituency (German: Wahlkreis) represented in the Bundestag. It elects one member via first-past-the-post voting. Under the current constituency numbering system, it is designated as constituency 70. It is located in eastern Saxony-Anhalt, comprising the city of Dessau-Roßlau and the district of Wittenberg.

Magdeburg was created for the 2009 federal election. Since 2017, it has been represented by Sepp Müller of the Christian Democratic Union (CDU).

Geography
Dessau – Wittenberg is located in eastern Saxony-Anhalt. As of the 2021 federal election, it comprises the independent city of Dessau-Roßlau as well as the district of Wittenberg.

History
Dessau – Wittenberg was created in 2009 and contained parts of the abolished constituencies of Elbe-Havel-Gebiet and Anhalt. In the 2009 election, it was constituency 71 in the numbering system. Since the 2013 election, it has been number 70. Its borders have not changed since its creation.

Members
The constituency was first represented by Ulrich Petzold of the Christian Democratic Union (CDU) from 2009 to 2017. Sepp Müller of the CDU was elected in 2017, and re-elected in 2021.

Election results

2021 election

2017 election

2013 election

2009 election

References

Federal electoral districts in Saxony-Anhalt
2009 establishments in Germany
Constituencies established in 2009